Rapid Run is a stream located entirely within Hamilton County, Ohio.

Rapid Run was so named on account of its relatively steep stream gradient.

See also
List of rivers of Ohio

References

Rivers of Hamilton County, Ohio
Rivers of Ohio